The 1968–69 New York Nets season was the first season of the Nets in New York and second overall season in the American Basketball Association (ABA). After one year in New Jersey, the team elected to play their games at Commack Arena in New York, the same place that they had tried to use for their one game playoff against the Kentucky Colonels that they forfeited due to unplayable conditions. Low attendance plagued the team at times, with the October 29 game drawing only 384 people to see the Nets play the Denver Rockets. Only 249 attended the game played on December 25, 1968 against the Rockets. The December 27 game was notable for a collision between Ken Wilburn and Rick Barry that cost Barry the rest of his season due to injury. Factors for the low attendance ranged from a lack of star power to the condition of the court, which was over the rink due to the Arena doubling as a hockey arena.

Draft picks

Roster

Playoffs

The Nets did not qualify for the playoffs this year.

References

New York Nets season
New Jersey Nets seasons
New York Nets
New York Nets
Sports in Smithtown, New York